Colin Zizzi (born January 20, 1988) is a former American soccer player. Zizzi played for Tercera División side Vallecas CF during the 2010–11 season. The following year, he joined Harrisburg City Islanders.

References

External links
 

1988 births
Living people
American soccer players
American Eagles men's soccer players
Penn FC players
USL Championship players
Soccer players from Pennsylvania
Association football midfielders